Mount Healthy Heights is a census-designated place (CDP) in Hamilton County, Ohio, United States. The population was 2,918 at the 2020 census.

Geography
Mount Healthy Heights is located at  (39.270508, -84.570143).

According to the United States Census Bureau, the CDP has a total area of 0.8 square mile (2.0 km2), all land.

Demographics

As of the census of 2000, there were 3,450 people, 1,281 households, and 959 families living in the CDP. The population density was 4,489.7 people per square mile (1,729.9/km2). There were 1,320 housing units at an average density of 1,717.8/sq mi (661.9/km2). The racial makeup of the CDP was 73.28% White, 23.33% African American, 0.09% Native American, 1.22% Asian, 0.55% from other races, and 1.54% from two or more races. Hispanic or Latino of any race were 0.99% of the population.

There were 1,281 households, out of which 38.5% had children under the age of 18 living with them, 53.6% were married couples living together, 15.8% had a female householder with no husband present, and 25.1% were non-families. 18.3% of all households were made up of individuals, and 3.5% had someone living alone who was 65 years of age or older. The average household size was 2.69 and the average family size was 3.08.

In the CDP, the population was spread out, with 27.3% under the age of 18, 11.3% from 18 to 24, 33.7% from 25 to 44, 21.5% from 45 to 64, and 6.2% who were 65 years of age or older. The median age was 31 years. For every 100 females, there were 95.5 males. For every 100 females age 18 and over, there were 91.5 males.

The median income for a household in the CDP was $45,245, and the median income for a family was $49,929. Males had a median income of $32,750 versus $25,101 for females. The per capita income for the CDP was $20,726. About 2.5% of families and 4.2% of the population were below the poverty line, including 7.4% of those under age 18 and 7.8% of those age 65 or over.

References

Census-designated places in Hamilton County, Ohio
Census-designated places in Ohio